Wingfield Cromwell, 2nd Earl of Ardglass, DCL, (12 September 1624 – 3 October 1668) was an English nobleman, son of Thomas Cromwell, 1st Earl of Ardglass and Elizabeth Meverell. He held the subsidiary titles of 2nd Viscount Lecale and 5th Baron Cromwell of Oakham.

Life
Wingfield Cromwell was born at Throwleigh, Staffordshire and educated at Stone School, Staffordshire. He matriculated at Trinity College, University of Dublin, Dublin, County Dublin, Leinster, on 20 March 1637/1638, and later awarded with the honorary degree of Doctor of Civil Law (DCL) by the University of Oxford, Oxford, Oxfordshire, in 1642.

In April 1649, during the English Civil War, he fought for King Charles I of England and was taken prisoner in the Royalist cause when fighting against Parliamentarians at Chester.

He succeeded to the titles of 5th Baron Cromwell of Oakham, in the Peerage of England (1540), 2nd Viscount Lecale, in Ulster, in the Peerage of Ireland (1624) and 2nd Earl of Ardglass, in the Peerage of Ireland (1645) in 1653.

He died on 3 October 1668 and was buried at Ilam, Staffordshire.

Marriage and issue
He married Mary Russell (bef. 1634 – aft. 12 September 1687), daughter of Sir William Russell, 1st Baronet, of Strensham, Worcestershire, and Frances Reade, daughter of Sir Thomas Reade, and had an only son:
 Thomas Cromwell, 3rd Earl of Ardglass (29 November 1653 – 11 April 1682)

His widow married secondly as his second wife in 1670 or between 1670 and 1675 Charles Cotton of Beresford Hall, Nottinghamshire, the angler and poet, and died in 1675 or after 12 September 1687.

References

Bibliography

External links 
 Ardglass, Earl of (I, 1645 – 1687) Cracroft's Peerage

1624 births
1668 deaths
Wingfield
People from Staffordshire
Royalist military personnel of the English Civil War
Earls of Ardglass
Barons Cromwell
Alumni of Trinity College Dublin
Military personnel from Staffordshire